Antialcidas Nikephoros (epithet means "the Victorious", Brahmi: 𑀅𑀁𑀢𑀮𑀺𑀓𑀺𑀢𑀲 Aṃtalikitasa, in the Heliodorus Pillar) was a king of the Indo-Greek Kingdom, who reigned from his capital at Taxila. Bopearachchi has suggested that he ruled from ca. 115 to 95 BCE in the western parts of the Indo-Greek realms, whereas R. C. Senior places him around 130 to 120 BCE and also in eastern Punjab (which seems better supported by coin findings). Senior does however believe that he ruled in tandem with King Lysias.

Genealogy
Antialcidas may have been a relative of the Greco-Bactrian king Heliocles I, but ruled after the fall of the Greco-Bactrian kingdom. Several later kings may have been related to Antialcidas: Heliokles II, Amyntas, Diomedes and Hermaeus all struck coins with similar features.

The Heliodorus inscription

Though there are few sources for the late Indo-Greek history, Antialcidas is known from an inscription left on a pillar (the Heliodorus pillar), which was erected by his ambassador Heliodorus at the court of the Shunga king Bhagabhadra at Vidisha, near Sanchi. It states that he was a devotee of Vishnu, the Hindu god.

A part of the inscription says: 
"This Garuda-standard was made by order of the Bhagavata ... Heliodoros, the son of Dion, a man of Taxila, a Greek ambassador from King Antialkidas, to King Bhagabhadra, the son of the Princess from Benares, the saviour, while prospering in the fourteenth year of his reign."

Coins

Otherwise, Antialcidas is also known through his plentiful coins. He issued a number of bilingual Indian silver types: diademed, wearing a helmet with bull's horns or a flat kausia. He also appears throwing a spear. According to some interpretations (Grousset), the baby elephant may symbolize the Buddha Siddhartha Gautama, who took the shape of a small elephant to enter the womb of his mother Queen Maya, a scene often depicted in Greco-Buddhist art. In that case the coin scene would represent a victory of Buddhism. According to other interpretations the elephant was the symbol of the city of Taxila.

"Mule coins" (overstrikes)

There is a bronze which features the obverse of Lysias and the reverse of Antialcidas. This was interpreted by Tarn and other earlier scholars as though the two kings might have forged some kind of alliance, but later, a bronze with the opposite arrangement was found.

Modern scholarship has however largely accepted that what was originally supposed to be a "joint issue" was in fact a mule; in other words, a mistake occurred in the process of overstriking the original coin, and it was accidentally issued with both king's standards.

References

Sources
 The Shape of Ancient Thought. Comparative studies in Greek and Indian Philosophies by Thomas McEvilley (Allworth Press and the School of Visual Arts, 2002) 
 Buddhism in Central Asia by B. N. Puri (Motilal Banarsidass, January 1, 2000) 
 The Greeks in Bactria and India, W. W. Tarn, Cambridge University Press.
 The Indo-Greeks, A. K. Narain, B.R Publications
 The Decline of the Indo-Greeks, R. C. Senior & D. MacDonald, the Hellenistic Numismatic Society

External links
Coins of Antialcidas
More coins of Antialcidas
Catalog of the coins of Antialcidas

Indo-Greek kings
1st-century BC rulers in Asia
2nd-century BC rulers in Asia